Rugāji Parish is an administrative unit of Balvi Municipality in the Latgale region of Latvia (Prior to the 2009 administrative reforms it was part of Balvi District).

References 

Parishes of Latvia
Balvi Municipality
Latgale